Viktor Zavarzin (born 28 November 1948) was an officer in the Soviet Ground Forces and later the Russian Ground Forces with the rank of colonel general.

He attended the Frunze Academy in 1981 and the General Staff Academy in 1992.

In 1994, he was chief of staff and first deputy commander of the Separate Combined-Arms Army of Turkmenistan, after Soviet units in Turkmenistan passed under joint control between Russia and Turkmenistan. The Library of Congress Country Studies said that 'the Treaty on Joint Measures signed by Russia and Turkmenistan in July 1992 provided for the Russian Federation to act as guarantor of Turkmenistan's security and made former Soviet army units in the republic the basis of the new national armed forces.'

Later he became Russia's first military representative at NATO Headquarters (from November 1997 to November 2001, according to Scott and Scott's Russian Military Directory 2002). He was there in post during the Kosovo War. He may have originated the 'dash to Pristina' idea that saw Russian troops, detached from the SFOR peacekeeping force in Bosnia-Hercegovina, arrive in Pristina before KFOR arrived there.

His final military appointment was First Deputy Chief of Staff of the Staff for Coordinating Military Cooperation of the Commonwealth of Independent States.

On December 7, 2003, Viktor Zavarzin was elected to the State Duma of the fourth convocation of the Kamchatka constituency number 88 (Kamchatka region), the party "United Russia". He became Chairman of the Defense Committee of the State Duma from 16 January 2004.

December 2, 2007 elected to the State Duma of the fifth convocation on a federal list of candidates nominated by the All-Russian political party "United Russia", a member of the General Council of "United Russia". Chairman of the Defense Committee of the State Duma of the Russian Federation from December 24, 2007.

Sanctions
In December 2022 the EU sanctioned Viktor Zavarzin in relation to the 2022 Russian invasion of Ukraine.

References

External links
 Биография на сайте Биография.ру
 Биография на сайте http://lobbying.ru

1948 births
Living people
Russian colonel generals
United Russia politicians
21st-century Russian politicians
Frunze Military Academy alumni
People from Sudzhansky District
Military Academy of the General Staff of the Armed Forces of Russia alumni
Fourth convocation members of the State Duma (Russian Federation)
Fifth convocation members of the State Duma (Russian Federation)
Sixth convocation members of the State Duma (Russian Federation)
Seventh convocation members of the State Duma (Russian Federation)
Eighth convocation members of the State Duma (Russian Federation)